A Colonel General was an officer of the French army during the Ancien Régime, the French Revolution, the Napoleonic era and the Bourbon Restoration.

The positions were not military ranks, but rather offices of the crown. The position was first created under François I. The Colonels General served directly below the Marshals of France, and they were divided by their branch of service. By the end of the Ancien Régime, the Colonels General were:

Colonel General of the Infantry
Colonel General of the Cavalry
Colonel General of the Dragoons
Colonel General of the Hussards
Colonel General of the Cent-Suisses and Grisons
Colonel General of the Gardes Françaises

Judging the position of Colonel General of the Infantry to be too powerful, Louis XIV suppressed the position in 1661 and only appointed Colonels General of honorific branches like the Colonel General of the Dragoons (created in 1668), the Colonel General of the Cent-Suisses and Grisons, who oversaw the Swiss regiments of the Maison du Roi, and the Colonel of the Gardes Françaises. The position was reinstated under Louis XV.

Most of these offices were eliminated at the time of the French Revolution, during which there was a Colonel General of the National Guard, but they were reinstated by Napoleon I. Under the Bourbon Restoration, certain titles were accorded to members of the royal family. After 1830, the position was eliminated.

Colonels General of the Ancien Régime

Infantry 

 1546 : Jean de Taix
 ???? : Charles de Cossé-Brissac
 1547 : Gaspard de Coligny, Admiral of France
 1555 : François de Coligny, seigneur d'Andelot
 1558 : Blaise de Montluc, Marshal of France
 1560 : Charles de La Rochefoucauld, seigneur de Randan
 1562 : Sébastien de Luxembourg, duc de Penthièvre
 ???? : Timoléon de Cossé-Brissac
 1569–1581 : Philippe Strozzi, seigneur d'Épernay and de Bressuire
 1581–1642 : Jean Louis de Nogaret de La Valette, duc d'Épernon
 1642–1661 : Bernard de Nogaret de La Valette d'Épernon
 1721–1730 : Louis d'Orléans, Duke of Orléans
 1780–1790 : Louis Joseph de Bourbon, Prince of Condé

Cavalry 

 1548–1549 : Charles de Cossé, Count of Brissac
 1549 : Claude de Lorraine, duc d'Aumale
 1558 : Jacques, Duke of Nemours
 1569–1571 : François de Lorraine, duc de Guise
 1571–1572 : Charles de Montmorency-Damville, Admiral of France
 1572–1574 : Guillaume de Montmorency, seigneur de Thuré
 1574–1585 : Jacques, Duke of Nemours
 1585–1586 : Charles, Duke of Aumale
 1586–1588 : Jean-François, maréchal de La Guiche
 1588–1589 : Charles de Valois, comte d'Auvergne
 1589–1595 : duc des Ursins
 1595–1604 : Charles de Valois, comte d'Auvergne
 1604–1616 : Jacques, Duke of Nemours
 1616–1618 : Charles de Valois, duc d'Angoulême
 1618–1618 :  François de Valois, comte d'Alès
 1618–1626 : Henri, Duke of Rohan
 1626–1643 : Louis de Valois, comte d'Alès
 1643–1653 : Louis Emmanuel de Valois, duc d'Angoulême
 1653–1657 : Louis de Lorraine, duc de Joyeuse
 1657–1675 : Henri de la Tour d'Auvergne-Bouillon, vicomte de Turenne
 1675–1705 : Frédéric Maurice de La Tour d'Auvergne
 1705–1740 : Henri Louis de La Tour d'Auvergne
 1740–1759 : Godefroy Charles Henri de La Tour d'Auvergne
 1759–1790 : marquis de Béthune

Dragoons 

 1668–1672 : Antonin Nompar de Caumont, duc de Lauzun
 1672–1678 : Nicolas d'Argouges, marquis de Rannes
 1678–1692 : Louis François de Boufflers, Marshal of France
 1692–1703 : René de Froulay, comte de Tessé, Marshal of France, général des Galères
 1703–1704 : Antoine V de Gramont, Marshal of France, colonel général des Gardes Françaises
 1704–1734 : François de Franquetot de Coigny, Marshal of France
 1734–1748 : Jean Antoine François de Franquetot, duc de Coigny, killed in a duel
 1748–1754 : François de Franquetot de Coigny, Marshal of France
 1754–1771 : Marie Charles Louis d'Albert, duc de Chevreuse and de Luynes
 1771–1783 : François-Henri de Franquetot de Coigny
 1783–1790 : Louis Joseph Charles Amable d'Albert, duc de Chevreuse and de Luynes

Hussards 

 1778–1790 : Louis Philippe II, Duke of Orléans

Cent-Suisses et Grisons 

 1568–1596 : Charles de Montmorency-Damville, Admiral of France
 1596–1605 : Nicolas de Harlay, seigneur de Sancy
 1605–1614 : Henri, duc de Rohan
 1614–1632 : François de Bassompierre, Marshal of France
 1632–1642 : César, marquis de Coislin
 1642–1643 : marquis de La Châtre
 1643–1647 : François de Bassompierre, Marshal of France
 1647–1657 : Charles de Schomberg, Marshal of France
 1657–1674 : Eugene Maurice, Count of Soissons
 1674–1710 : Louis Auguste, Duke of Maine
 1710–1755 : Louis Auguste, Prince of Dombes
 1755–1762 : Louis Charles, Count of Eu
 1762–1771 : Étienne François de Choiseul-Stainville, duc de Choiseul
 1771–1790 : Charles Philippe, Count of Artois, brother of Louis XVI

Gardes-Françaises 

 1661–1671 : Antoine, duc de Gramont
 1672–1692 : François d'Aubusson de La Feuillade
 1692–1704 : Louis François, duc de Boufflers
 1704–1717 : Antoine de Gramont, duc de Guiche
 1717–1741 : Louis Antoine Armand, duc de Gramont
 1741–1745 : Louis, duc de Gramont
 1745–1788 : Louis Antoine de Gontaut, duc de Biron

Colonels General of the Revolution 

 National Guard: Gilbert du Motier, Marquis de Lafayette

Colonels General of the Napoleonic era 

 Carabiniers à Cheval: Louis Bonaparte, king of Holland and Constable of the Empire
 Chasseurs à cheval: Auguste Frédéric Louis Viesse de Marmont, then Emmanuel, comte de Grouchy
 Chasseurs à Pied of the Imperial Guard: Jean-de-Dieu Soult, Duc de Dalmatie
 Cuirassiers: Laurent, comte Gouvion-Saint-Cyr, then Augustin, comte Belliard
 Dragoons: Louis, comte Baraguey d'Hilliers, then Étienne-Marie-Antoine Champion, Comte de Nansouty (1813-1814)
 Imperial Guard: Edouard Adolphe Casimir Joseph Mortier, then Louis Gabriel Suchet
 Grenadiers à pied of the Imperial Guard: Louis Nicolas Davout
 Hussards: Jean Andoche Junot
 Suisses: Louis-Alexandre Berthier, Vice-Constable of the Empire, then Jean Lannes, duc de Montebello

Colonels General of the Restoration 

 Royal Carabiniers: Louis Antoine, Duke of Angoulême, eldest son of Charles X
 Chevau-légers-lanciers: Charles Ferdinand, Duke of Berry, younger son of Charles X
 Cuirassiers: Louis Antoine, Duke of Angoulême
 Garde Nationale: Charles Philippe, Count of Artois, brother of Louis XVIII
 Suisses: Henri, grandson of Charles X

See also
 Great Officers of the Crown of France

References
This article is based in part on the article Colonel général from the French Wikipedia, retrieved on September 8, 2006.

External links
Great Officers of the Crown

French court titles
Court titles in the Ancien Régime
Military history of the Ancien Régime
Military ranks of France